Parental Control is a reality television show about people looking for love produced by MTV. The two directors, Brendon Carter and Bruce Klassen, have also created other MTV shows.
In Asia, this show was aired on Channel V from 2007–2009.

Plot
The version which aired February 2006, differs from its premiere on MTV's Spring Break 2005 in March. A girl was to interview five boys, and after a set of about five questions for each person or an activity of some sort, the father will eliminate one of the contestants. This continues until one contestant remained.

In the latest version, parents (or in some cases, at least one parent and either his girlfriend, her boyfriend, his/her domestic partner, or the child's uncle or aunt) or guardians (either both grandparents or the child's older sibling, if any) from Los Angeles or elsewhere in Southern California are unhappy with their child's current boyfriend or girlfriend. Auditions have started as the number of applicants must be given an interview from the parents who vie for the affections of their child and both parents would eventually pick the two potential partners. Afterwards, their child goes on a blind date with the two selections that each parent chose.  The child then has to decide whether to keep their current relationship, stay single, or choose one of the new prospects from his or her parents. In one episode called Kids Are In Control, where the roles are reversed with the children are unhappy with their parent's current boyfriend or girlfriend.

During each date, the parents and the current partner watch and comment, often antagonistically, as the date unfolds on television. When the dates are finished, the child selects their new partner from amongst the competitors and current partner. First, one of the competitors is eliminated before the other two, then the child chooses between his/her current partner and the last remaining competitor, commenting what they liked from the remaining parent's choice and from their current boyfriend/girlfriend. The child must have to choose on the final pick and here are the choices:

If he/she chooses to stay with the current girlfriend/boyfriend which angers their parents who had hoped to be rid of their child's significant other and the eliminated competitor makes unpleasant and rude comments.
If he/she chooses their parents' choice becoming his/her new girlfriend/boyfriend which the parents are happy on the child's pick, resulting their current significant other to leave angry and make rude comments.
If he/she chooses to leave single, and will eliminate both the current significant other and one of the dates that his or her parents orchestrated.

The whole process often results in unpleasant behavior from the two who were eliminated. In a rare occasion, the child's chosen date would reject them and go with their previous significant other. Another rare occasion had the child's chosen boyfriend/girlfriend break up with them right away, leading the angry parent to chase after them.

The show like the other reality shows aired on MTV has been accused of being staged and fake.

Ratings
Aside from the Spring Break 2005 premiere (which only had one episode), the show premiered in February 2006 as a spring replacement show without much hype or commercials. The show, much like other MTV dating shows (Next and Date My Mom), started off with few viewers and grew to a fair-rated show.

The first season ended airing new shows around June 2006, to make more room for new seasons of Made, Room Raiders, and Next, and start the new TV series Why Can't I Be You?. The second season began later that year in October.

In March 2007, a new series was filmed in UK.

References

External links
 
 

American dating and relationship reality television series
MTV game shows
Television series by Reveille Productions
2005 American television series debuts
2000s American reality television series
2010s American reality television series
2010 American television series endings
Television shows filmed in California